Bob Socci  (born 1967) is an American TV and radio sports broadcaster. He is currently the radio play-by-play voice of the NFL's New England Patriots.

Early life and education 

Socci was born in Auburn, New York. He is a 1985 graduate of Auburn High School, where he was a member of the school's 1985 New York state championship baseball team.

Socci is a 1989 graduate of the University of Dayton.

Sports broadcasting career 

Socci was hired as the new play-by-play voice of the New England Patriots in April 2013, replacing Gil Santos, who retired after 36 years with the team. Socci is partnered with Scott Zolak on Patriots broadcasts.

Since joining the Patriots broadcast, Socci and Zolak have called three Super Bowl Championships. In February 2015 the Patriots won the franchises fourth Super Bowl defeating the Seattle Seahawks when rookie cornerback Malcolm Butler intercepted a pass at the goal line sealing the title.  In February 2017 the duo called "The Greatest Comeback in Super Bowl History" when the Patriots rallied from a 28-3 third quarter deficit to beat the Atlanta Falcons 34-28 in the first overtime game in 51 years of the Super Bowl. He was named Massachusetts Sportscaster of the Year 2021.

Before joining the Patriots, Socci's previous broadcasting experience included 15 seasons as the play-by-play voice of Navy Midshipmen football (1998–2012), 11 seasons as the voice of Navy basketball (1997–2008), and a decade of calling Patriot League basketball games for networks including CSTV, ESPNU, and CBS Sports Network.

Socci also has over two decades of experience as a minor league baseball radio play-by-play announcer, calling games for the Pawtucket Red Sox (2013), Norfolk Tides (2006–2011), Albuquerque Isotopes (2003–2005), Frederick Keys (1999–2001), Delmarva Shorebirds (1996–1998),, Peoria Chiefs (1993–1995), and Rochester Red Wings (1991–1992).

Personal life 
Socci lives in Milton, Massachusetts, with his wife, Monique Tello, their two children, Gio and Maria, dog Obi.

References

External links 
 Bob Socci — Official site
 
 Bob Socci interviewed by Felger & Mazz (2013)

Living people
1968 births
People from Auburn, New York
People from Milton, Massachusetts
American television sports announcers
American radio sports announcers
Navy Midshipmen football announcers
New England Patriots announcers
National Football League announcers
Baseball announcers
College basketball announcers in the United States
Minor League Baseball broadcasters